Yang Hong-won (Hangul: 양홍원, born January 12, 1999), also known by his former stage name Young B (Hangul: 영비), is a South Korean rapper. He was the winner of the first season of High School Rapper. He released his first extended play, Sokonyun, on August 17, 2018.

Discography

Studio albums

Extended plays

Charted singles

References

1999 births
Living people
South Korean male rappers
South Korean hip hop singers
21st-century South Korean male singers